Sink testing is a form of medical laboratory diagnostics healthcare fraud whereby clinical specimens are discarded, via a sink drain, and fabricated results are reported, without the clinical specimen actually being tested.

In the United States, the prevalence of sink testing laboratories in the 1980s led in part to regulation following the passage of Clinical Laboratory Improvement Amendments in 1988.

While the illegal practice still does occur, it is rare within the highly regulated US lab market.

References

Medical crime
Fraud
Clinical pathology